The Speaker of the House of Representatives is one of the 150 members of the House of Representatives of the Netherlands, elected to lead the meetings of the House. The Speaker also chairs the Chamber's Presidium and the Procedure Committee. Prior to the 1982 constitutional revision, the Speaker was appointed by the Crown.
 
The office is currently held by Vera Bergkamp of Democrats 66 (D66). She was elected to succeed Khadija Arib. She was on her turn elected on 13 January 2016 in an interim election, after Speaker Anouchka van Miltenburg of the People's Party for Freedom and Democracy (VVD) resigned on 12 December 2015. She was First Deputy and Acting Speaker until her election.

Duties
As a member of the House of Representatives, the Speaker has the same rights and obligations as other members. The Speaker leads the meetings of the House. The officeholder opens and closes the meetings and determines who speaks. The members of the House, as well as Ministers and State Secretaries are not supposed to address each other directly, but always address the Speaker instead, as a method to encourage civility. While the Speaker also takes part in the voting (as a regular member of the House of Representatives), the officeholder typically does not participate in debates.

Besides leading the meetings, the Speaker represents the House of Representatives as a whole, such as in ceremonies and with visits by foreign heads of state. The Speaker is also the chair of the Presidium, which is responsible for determining the budget of the House, setting its agenda and appointing its staff.

The Speaker is supported by Deputy Speakers, ranked by number in order of precedence, which also are members of the House. If the Speaker is unable to fulfill their duties or the position becomes vacant, then the meeting is chaired by the First Deputy Speaker. The Speaker has a seat with a backrest that is higher than the other seats in the House.

Election 
The Speaker is elected by the members of the House of Representatives. Such an election takes place shortly after a general election or after the position became vacant. The House adopts a profile that outlines the desired qualities that potential candidates should have, such as prior experience and personal traits. The profile is not binding, however. Members can submit their candidacy, but this is not required.

The election itself requires the participation of at least 76 members. To win the election, a Member needs to obtain an absolute majority of the votes cast (more than 50%). The voting takes place by open and secret ballot, which means that Members have to write down the name of the preferred Member themselves and that the vote is not disclosed. Members can choose between writing down the name of one of the candidates, the name of any other Member (whether they are standing or not), something invalid or nothing at all.

An election requires multiple voting rounds when no member wins an absolute majority. If there is no winner after two rounds, the rules of voting are different. In the third round, the list of members who were voted for in the second round is definitive. In addition, the number of eligible members is limited, depending on the number of members who received votes in the second round. If fewer than five members received votes then all members except the two frontrunners are eliminated from the election, otherwise only four frontrunners remain. In the fourth round, only the two frontrunners are eligible, any other votes are deemed invalid. If both members have the same number of votes, the election is decided by lot.

Members of the Presidium

See also
 List of speakers of the House of Representatives (Netherlands)
 President of the Senate (Netherlands)

References

External links

 President of the House at the website of the House of Representatives

 
House of Representatives (Netherlands)
Legislative speakers in the Netherlands
Netherlands